Tye may refer to:

People with the name

Surname
Albert Tye (1883–1917), English footballer
Andrew Tye (born 1986), Australian cricketer
 Christopher Tye (c. 1500–c. 1570), 16th-century composer and organist
 Colonel Tye (1753–1780), Loyalist leader in the American revolution
 John Tye (cricketer) (1848–1905), an English cricketer who played for Derbyshire and Nottinghamshire
 John Tye (whistleblower) (born c. 1976), American surveillance whistleblower 
 Kay M. Tye (born c. 1981), American neuroscientist and assistant professor at MIT's Picower Institute for Learning and Memory
 Michael Tye (artist), Australian mosaic artist
 Michael Tye (philosopher), American philosopher
 Will Tye, American football tight end for the New York Giants

Given name
 Tiye or Tye (1398–1338 BC), a queen of ancient Egypt
 Tye Warner Bietz (born 1984), Canadian trap shooter
 Tye Fields (born 1975), American heavyweight boxer
 Tye Harvey (born 1974), American pole vaulter
 Tye Hill (born 1982), American football cornerback
 Tye McGinn (born 1990), Canadian ice hockey left winger
 Tye Perdido (born 1988), American soccer player
 Tye Leung Schulze (1887-1972), Chinese-American interpreter
 Tye Sheridan (born 1996), American actor
 Tye Smith (born 1993), American football cornerback
 Tye Tribbett (born 1977), American gospel singer, songwriter and choir director
 Tye Waller (born 1957), American baseball coach
 Tye White (born 1984), American actor
 Tye Kee Yoon (born 1849), Chinese diplomat

Places
 Tye, Hampshire, a location in England
 Tye, Texas, US
 Tye, Washington, US

Other uses
 A nautical term for a chain or rope used for hoisting or lowering a yard

See also
 Ty (disambiguation)
 Tiye (disambiguation)
 Tie (disambiguation)